Solygeia is a former municipality in Corinthia, Peloponnese, Greece. Since the 2011 local government reform it is part of the municipality Corinth, of which it is a municipal unit. The municipal unit has an area of 179.461 km2. Population 2,723 (2011). The seat of the municipality was in Sofiko.

References

Populated places in Corinthia